Carlos Ezequiel Córdoba (born 6 June 1995) is an Argentine footballer who plays as a midfielder for Leonardo Murialdo.

Career
Córdoba featured for Deportivo Maipú's academy from 2005, departing three years later to Independiente Rivadavia's youth. 2015 saw Córdoba move into their first-team for the upcoming Primera B Nacional campaign, initially appearing as an unused substitute in July for fixtures with Sportivo Belgrano and Unión Mar del Plata. He made his professional debut on 2 August 2015 in a goalless draw at the Estadio José Antonio Romero Feris against Boca Unidos. Córdoba stayed until 2018 though didn't make any more appearances. After leaving Independiente Rivadavia, he signed with Leonardo Murialdo of Liga Mendocina.

Career statistics
.

References

External links

1995 births
Living people
Sportspeople from Mendoza, Argentina
Argentine footballers
Association football midfielders
Primera Nacional players
Independiente Rivadavia footballers